The 2012 Nicky Rackard Cup is the eighth season of the Nicky Rackard Cup since its establishment in 2005.  A total of six teams will contest the Nicky Rackard Cup, including four sides from the 2011 Nicky Rackard Cup and one promoted team from the 2011 Lory Meagher Cup and one team relegated from the 2011 Christy Ring Cup.  The teams are:
Monaghan
Roscommon
Sligo
Louth
Armagh *Relegated from 2011 Christy Ring Cup
Donegal *Promoted from 2011 Lory Meagher Cup

Structure
The tournament has a double elimination format - each team will play at least two games before being knocked out.
There are two Round 1 matches.
The winners in Round 1 advance to Round 2.
The losers in Round 1 go into the quarter-finals.
There are two Round 2 matches.
The winners in Round 2 advance to the semifinals.
The losers in Round 2 go into the quarter finals.
The losers of the relegation playoff are relegated to the Lory Meagher Cup for 2013.
There are two quarter-final matches between the Round 1 losers and Round 2 winners.
The winners of the quarter-finals advance to the semifinals.
The losers of the quarter-finals are eliminated.
There are two semifinal matches, between the Round 2 winners and the quarter-final winners.
The winners of the semifinals advance to the final.
The losers of the semifinals are eliminated.
The winners of the final win the Nicky Rackard Cup for 2012 and are promoted to the Christy Ring Cup for 2013.

Fixtures

Round 1

Round 2

Quarter-finals

Semifinals

Final

Scoring

Widest winning margin: 20 points
Louth 3-18 - 0-07 Donegal (Semifinal)
Most goals in a match: 5
Armagh 4-12 - 1-17 Roscommon (Semifinal)
Most points in a match: 31
Monaghan 0-15 - 1-16 Donegal (Round 2)
Most goals by one team in a match: 4
Armagh 4-12 - 1-17 Roscommon (Semifinal)
Most goals scored by a losing team: 1
Armagh 4-12 - 1-17 Roscommon (Semifinal)
Roscommon 2-19 - 1-11 Monaghan (Quarter-final)
Louth 3-15 - 1-09 Sligo (Quarter-final)
Armagh 0-20 - 1-08 Louth (Round 1)
Most points scored by a losing team: 17
Armagh 4-12 - 1-17 Roscommon (Semifinal)

Nicky Rackard Cup
Nicky Rackard Cup